Neighborhood News is the publisher of five free weeklies, based in Manchester, New Hampshire. The five weeklies are The Hooksett Banner, The Bedford Bulletin, The Goffstown News, The Bow Times and the Salem Observer. Neighborhood News also publishes a bi-weekly called  The New Hampshire Mirror which focuses on women's issues. Amy J. Vellucci is the publisher of Neighborhood News. The company was owned by Nackey Scagliotti until December, 2003, when it became a wholly owned subsidiary of the Nackey S. Loeb School of Communications, Inc.

NewHampshire.com
NewHampshire.com is owned by the New Hampshire Union Leader newspaper. The website is an information portal for arts and entertainment, community news, recreation and local business information for the state of New Hampshire.  NewHampshire.com was created in 1999.  It has since been a consistent resource to the community for arts, entertainment, nightlife, recreation and information about the state of New Hampshire.

Contributors
Sarah Neveu
Lisa Martineau

External links
The Neighborhood News Inc. Web site
NewHampshire.com
The Union Leader/New Hampshire Sunday News

Newspapers published in New Hampshire
Manchester, New Hampshire
Goffstown, New Hampshire
Mass media in New Hampshire
Hillsborough County, New Hampshire